Thomas Starkie (2 January 1782 – 15 April 1849) was an English lawyer and jurist. A talented mathematician in his youth, he especially contributed to the unsuccessful attempts to codify the English criminal law in the nineteenth century.

Early life
Born in Blackburn, Lancashire, Thomas was the eldest son of the Rev. Thomas Starkie, vicar of Blackburn, and his wife, Ann née Yatman. He was educated at Clitheroe Royal Grammar School and St John's College, Cambridge, from where he graduated in 1803 as senior wrangler and first Smith's prizeman. In the same year, he became a Fellow of St Catharine's College, Cambridge. In 1812 he married Lucy, eldest daughter of Rev. Thomas Dunham Whitaker which entailed that he resign his fellowship. The couple went on to parent five children.

Legal practice
Starkie entered Lincoln's Inn as a pupil of Joseph Chitty and was called to the bar in 1810, proceeding to practise as a special pleader as well as on the northern circuit, and becoming a QC.

In 1823 he became Downing Professor of law at Cambridge though he had little success in attracting pupils with his poor presentations, a fate shared with his contemporary John Austin. He repeated his failure at the Inner Temple in 1833. However, in 1833, Starkie was appointed to the royal commission on a proposed English Criminal Code and spent the rest of his life on various commissions on reform and codification of the criminal law. He was not always popular with his colleagues, Henry Bellenden Ker calling him "childish" and "desultory and wayward".

He was also a sometime law reporter and author of the influential texts: A Practical Treatise on the Law of Slander, Libel, and Incidentally of Malicious Prosecutions (1812) and A Practical Treatise on the Law of Evidence (1824). In 1847, Starkie became a judge in the Clerkenwell small-debts court.

He died in his rooms in Downing College, Cambridge.

Politics
Starkie's instincts were Tory and he opposed the Catholic Relief Act 1829. However, in 1840 he unsuccessfully stood as a Liberal Party candidate in Cambridge.

References

Bibliography
Obituaries:
Gentleman's Magazine, 2nd ser., 32 (1849), 208;
Law Review, 10 (1849), 201–4

Lobban, M. (2004) "Starkie, Thomas (1782–1849)", Oxford Dictionary of National Biography, Oxford University Press, accessed 9 Aug 2007 (subscription required)

1782 births
1849 deaths
English barristers
English legal writers
Alumni of St John's College, Cambridge
Fellows of St Catharine's College, Cambridge
Senior Wranglers
People educated at Clitheroe Royal Grammar School
People from Blackburn
Downing Professors of the Laws of England
19th-century English lawyers